Song Dong-Jin (Hangul: 송동진, born May 12, 1984) is a South Korea football player who last played for Pohang Steelers.

Club career
Song began his football career with Pohang Steelers's youth team under-12 sides. From 2006 to 2007 season, Song served his two year for military duty at National Police Agency FC. He played reserve league of K-League, so-called R-League mostly. Song made his debut in competitive match for the Pohang on 19 December 2009, 2009 FIFA Club World Cup match for third-place result a 4–3 on penalty win. In this match, he saved two kicker on penalty shootout.

Club career statistics

References

External links
 
 FIFA Player Statistics

1984 births
Living people
Association football goalkeepers
South Korean footballers
Pohang Steelers players
K League 1 players
People from Pohang
Sportspeople from North Gyeongsang Province